Clematodes larreae, the gray creosotebush grasshopper, is a species of short-horned grasshopper in the family Acrididae. It is found in North America.

References

Acrididae
Articles created by Qbugbot
Insects described in 1901